Not Under the Jurisdiction is a 1969 Soviet drama film directed by Vladimir Krasnopolskiy and Valery Uskov.

Plot 
Yegorov was slandered by his friend Sorokin and abandoned by a girl who later married Sorokin. And so they find themselves together on board the airplane, which is piloted by Yegorov.

Cast 
 Oleg Strizhenov as Yegorov Sergey
 Lyudmila Maksakova as Nadya
 Leonid Kuravlyov as Sorokin
 Olga Soshnikova as Olya
 Svetlana Svetlichnaya as Vika
 Pyotr Glebov as Pyotr Samoylov
 Sergey Nikonenko as Innokentiy
 Vladimir Gusev as Tsyganok
 Vladimir Kuznetsov as Seryozha (as Volodya Kuznetsov)
 Nikolai Lirov

References

External links 
 

1969 films
1960s Russian-language films
Soviet drama films
1969 drama films